Fasiq is a 2021 Pakistani television series, directed by Saleem Ghanchi and written by Huma Hina Nafees. It is produced by Abdullah Kadwani and Asad Qureshi under their banner 7th Sky Entertainment. It premiered on 23 November 2021 on Geo TV. It stars Sehar Khan, Adeel Chaudhry, Haroon Shahid, Sukaina Khan in the leading roles.

Cast

Main cast
 Sehar Khan as Fatima (Mutahir's 1st wife, later married Umair)
 Adeel Chaudhry as Mutahir 
 Haroon Shahid as Umair 
 Sukaina Khan as Aneeqa (Mutahir's 2nd Wife)

Recurring cast
 Mohsin Gilani as Mansoor (Umair's Father)
 Tariq Jamil as Shafeeq (Fatima's father)
 Hira Tareen as Sawera (Mutahir's 3rd wife) 
 Azra Mohyeddin as Nasreen (Umair's mother)
 Sabiha Hashmi as Amna (Sawera's mother)
 Beena Chaudhary as Saima (Mutahir's mother)
 Sadaf Aashan as Sultana (Anika's mother)

Development
Fasiq is coming to television screens with a stirring narrative about unrequited love, rejection and regret.

Release
The teasers of the serial were released on November 18, 2021, prior to its television premier. On 18 November 2021, it was revealed to air from 23 November. The show is being aired from Monday to Sunday at 9:00 PM PST.

References

Geo TV original programming
Pakistani drama television series
2021 Pakistani television series debuts
Urdu-language television shows
2022 Pakistani television series endings